Gracias Por La Música is a Spanish-language album by Swedish pop group ABBA, released in Spain on 5 April 1980 and Latin America on May 10. Gracias Por La Música was originally released due to the unexpected surge in popularity for the group in Latin American countries such as Mexico and Argentina after the release of the Spanish-language versions of "Chiquitita" and "I Have a Dream" in 1979. These tracks were both released as singles and went on to become big hits. Encouraged by this success, the band therefore decided to record another eight tracks in Spanish and release a full-length album especially for the Latin American market. The album was also released in ABBA's native Sweden on June 23, and in Japan on July 21 after ABBA played eleven successful concerts earlier in March.

Background and production
The album's title is the Spanish translation of the title of one of ABBA's hits, "Thank You for the Music". The couple Buddy and Mary McCluskey, both working at RCA Records in Argentina at the time, were again called in to translate the lyrics. During the recording sessions which took place in January 1980 in the Polar Music studios the lead vocalists Agnetha Fältskog and Anni-Frid Lyngstad were helped with the pronunciation by Swedish/Spanish journalist Ana Martinez.

Neither Benny Andersson nor Björn Ulvaeus played an active role in the creation of the eight new Spanish tracks, leaving the production in the hands of the group's sound engineer Michael B. Tretow, who recorded the new Spanish vocal overdubs onto existing backing tracks at his home studio. The absence of Andersson and Ulvaeus is most apparent on "Al Andar" (the Spanish version of "Move On") where the original opening speech from Ulvaeus was replaced by a more conventional opening verse sung by Agnetha. Meanwhile, some of Tretow's new Spanish mixes were significantly different from their English counterparts, reflecting his own personal preferences regarding the handling of drum sounds as well as the significant time gap between the two versions, with some tracks being revisited up to six years after their original completion.

Gracias Por La Música was certified Platinum in Spain, and stayed on the charts for twenty-one weeks.

Gracias Por La Música saw numerous CD issues in the 1980s including releases in Japan in 1986 (on Polydor), Spain in 1989 (on RCA), and a rare CBS issue of an unknown date. The album was deleted in most territories after the compilation CD ABBA Oro: Grandes Exitos, which contained the ten tracks of Gracias Por La Música, was released in 1992, rendering this album obsolete. However, the original version of the album continued to be available in Japan and Argentina until the late 1990s.

A CD/DVD 'Deluxe Edition' release of the album was released worldwide on 10 November 2014, it peaked #47 in Spain, and #106 in Belgium.

Track listing
All songs written and composed by Benny Andersson & Björn Ulvaeus with Spanish lyrics by Buddy & Mary McCluskey except where noted.

2014 re-release bonus tracks

2014 re-release bonus DVD
"Chiquitita" (300 millones, TVE)
"Chiquitita" (Aplauso, TVE)
"Estoy Soñando" (Promo Clip)
ABBA on Spanish TV (Especial Aplauso 100, TVE)
"Conociéndome, Conociéndote" (Promo Clip)
"Gracias por la Música" (Promo Clip)
"¡Dame! ¡Dame! ¡Dame!"
"Felicidad" (Promo Clip)
"No Hay a Quien Culpar" (Promo Clip)
International Sleeve Gallery

All songs in Spanish translation by Buddy and Mary McCluskey, except where noted.
The Spanish version of "Dancing Queen" was originally titled "Reina Danzante", but was retitled "La Reina del Baile" for the 1993 ABBA Oro CD release.

Charts

Sales and certifications

References

1980 compilation albums
ABBA compilation albums
Spanish-language compilation albums
Polar Music compilation albums
Polydor Records compilation albums
CBS Records compilation albums
RCA Records compilation albums
Albums recorded at Polar Studios
Albums produced by Björn Ulvaeus
Albums produced by Benny Andersson